Filip Lichý (born 25 January 2001) is a Slovak footballer who plays for Slovan Bratislava of the Fortuna Liga as a midfielder.

Club career

Slovan Bratislava
Lichý, as a result of their academy, was promoted to the first team of Slovan Bratislava in the winter of 2019-2020. He made his professional Fortuna Liga debut for Slovan against AS Trenčín on 22 February 2020, in a home fixture at Tehelné pole. Lichý came on as a replacement for Dávid Holman after 82 minutes, with the final score (2:0 win) already set earlier by Vernon De Marco and Rafael Ratão.

In the next round, Lichý made his starting-XI debut, in an away fixture at pod Zoborom, against Nitra. Slovan won the game narrowly 0:1, despite the 36 point gap in the league table at the time, with Moha scoring the only goal of the match. After the match Slovan's manager, Ján Kozák Jr. praised Lichý's performance, citing that he earned the cap by hard work during the winter preparation. Lichý had commented that he was nervous at the start but was grateful for the support of his quality team-mates, allowing him to play with ease.

However, Lichý ultimately missed most of 2020 as a result of an anterior cruciate ligament injury.

Loan at Ružomberok
In the winter of 2021-22, Lichý was loaned to Ružomberok until the end of the season. This loan was extended by another year in July 2022, allowing Lichý to feature for Ružomberok in Europa Conference League qualifiers. Lichý returned to Slovan Bratislava in December 2022.

Honours

Club
Slovan Bratislava
Fortuna Liga (2): 2019–20, 2020–21
Slovnaft Cup (1): 2019–20

References

External links
 ŠK Slovan Bratislava official club profile 
 Futbalnet profile 
 
 

2001 births
Living people
Slovak footballers
Slovakia youth international footballers
Slovakia under-21 international footballers
Sportspeople from Banská Bystrica
Association football midfielders
ŠK Slovan Bratislava players
MFK Ružomberok players
2. Liga (Slovakia) players
Slovak Super Liga players